Kirsti Saxi (born 1 December 1953) is a Norwegian politician for the Socialist Left Party.

She served as a deputy representative to the Norwegian Parliament from Finnmark during the term 1997–2001, 2001–2005 and 2005–2009.

Following the 2003 election, Saxi became the new deputy county mayor (fylkesvaraordfører) of Finnmark. When the county mayor Helga Pedersen left to join the national cabinet, Saxi became county mayor (fylkesordfører). She lost the position following the 2007 election.

References

1953 births
Living people
Deputy members of the Storting
Socialist Left Party (Norway) politicians
Chairmen of County Councils of Norway
Finnmark politicians
Norwegian Sámi politicians
Norwegian Sámi people
Women members of the Storting
Women mayors of places in Norway